Michiharu (written: , ,  or  in hiragana) is a masculine Japanese given name. Notable people with the name include:

, Japanese manga artist
, Japanese writer, playwright and critic
, Japanese footballer
, Japanese sport shooter
, Japanese footballer
, Japanese samurai and general

Japanese masculine given names